Ralph Adams-Hale (born 31 March 1997) is an English professional rugby union player who plays as a prop for Premiership Rugby club Saracens.

Early life and education
Adams-Hale lived for much of his childhood in the village of Kimpton, Hertfordshire before moving to St Albans for the Saracens academy squad.

Adams-Hale attended Roundwood Park School and subsequently studied physics at King's College London, although "would have been at Cambridge had it been possible to juggle the logistics".

Rugby career
Adams-Hale began playing rugby at a young age, playing junior rugby with Harpenden RFC. He played back row when he was a teenager. He continued up to senior level with Harpenden, and also became a key figure in his school First XV. 

Adams-Hale was a member of the England under-20 squad that completed a grand slam during the 2017 Six Nations Under 20s Championship. Later that year he started for the side that finished runners up to New Zealand in the final of the 2017 World Rugby Under 20 Championship.

In October 2018 Adams-Hale made his club debut for Saracens in a Premiership Rugby Cup match against Leicester Tigers and also featured in the final of that competition as they finished runners up to Northampton Saints. At the end of that season he came off the bench in the Premiership final as Saracens defeated Exeter Chiefs to retain their title.

After Saracens were relegated for salary cap breaches, Adams-Hale featured in the 2021 RFU Championship play-off victory over Ealing Trailfinders which saw Saracens gain promotion and an immediate return to the top flight. He signed a new contract which will see him remain with Saracens until at least 2023.

References

1997 births
Living people
English rugby union players
Rugby union players from Hertfordshire
Saracens F.C. players
Rugby union props
Alumni of King's College London